DC Universe All-Stars is a 6-inch action figure toyline to be released by Mattel beginning in 2012. It is the follow-up to Mattel's previous 6-inch toyline DC Universe Classics, and focuses on characters owned by DC Comics.

History
At the 2011 San Diego Comic-Con International, Mattel revealed that they were restarting the DC Universe Classics line at the retail level. The inspiration for this decision were The New 52 changes being made to DC Comics' characters. However many speculate that the line may have been cancelled because it should have started pre-order shipping late 2011 through early 2012. The figures were shown at San Diego Comic Con 2012 in July.

Wave One
Mattel revealed the line-up of the first wave on their website in November 2011. After the 2012 Toy Fair, plans changed, and the first wave was altered by excluding a Batman Beyond figure and adding a Red Robin figure with no Collect and Connect figure. The lineup includes:

Batman (The New 52)
Red Robin
Superman (The New 52)
Superboy-Prime

References

Further reading
Zenker, Gary (2013). Ultimate DC Comics Action Figures and Collectibles Checklist. White Lightning Publishing. 

Mattel
2010s toys
DC Comics action figure lines